James T. Powers (born James T. McGovern; April 26, 1862– February 10, 1943), was an American stage actor, vocalist, and lyricist.

Biography
Powers began on the stage in Boston in 1880 and also spent time in circuses and later, in vaudevilles. In the 1890s, he acted in many American versions of the so-called Gaiety musicals, originating in the London's West End, then coming into vogue in the United States.

His entire career was spent in live theatre. He, however, has one IMDb credit for a short film from 1905 Digesting a Joke (James T. Powers).

On May 19, 1892, he married in Rochester, New York the actress Rachel Booth (1862-1955). They toured together in several productions. The Powers made their home in the Ansonia residential hotel in New York City.

His autobiography, Twinkle Little Star was published in New York in 1939.

James T. Powers died in New York City on February 11, 1943.

References

External links

 
 James T. Powers portrait gallery, New York Public Library
 James T. Powers portraits, University of Washington Sayre
   James T. and Rachel Booth Powers portraits, University of Louisville, Macauley Theatre Collection
 North American Theatre Online: James T. Powers
 James T. Powers (lyricist), Discography of American Historical Recordings 
Rachel Booth and other actresses

1862 births
1943 deaths
American male stage actors
Male actors from New York (state)
Singers from New York (state)